Yelena Aleksandrovna Lyubimova (Russian: Елена Александровна Любимова; 1925–1985) was a Soviet geologist known for her geothermal research and one of the first women geophysicists from the Soviet Union to conduct research in the Atlantic Ocean.

Early life and education 
Lyubimova was born in Moscow and attended Moscow State University, where she studied physics under Andrey Nikolayevich Tikhonov and Otto Schmidt.

She earned her degree in 1955 and 1966.

Career and research 
Lyubimova's entire career was spent at the Geophysical Institute, now the Institute of Earth Physics. Her research included studies of heat exchange in the Earth's interior, the evolution of the Earth and Moon, subduction and spreading zones in the Kola trench, heat flow along continents and oceans in the Arctic, heat flow anomalies, and electroconductivity. She was a founder of the International Committee for Heat Flow and coordinated a major project to map heat flow in the lithosphere.

Honors and awards 
 President, International Committee for Heat Flow (1971–1979)
 Vice-President, Scientific Council for Geothermal Research

References

Papers 
 Elena Aleksandrovna Lubimova (1925—1985) // Geothermics. 1986. Vol. 15. N 1. P. 1-2.

1925 births
1985 deaths
Soviet geologists
Moscow State University alumni